Protovis himalayensis is a prehistoric species of sheep found in latest Miocene to Late Pliocene-aged strata of Himalayan Tibet in 2016.

Protovis was found only by some fragments such as its horns. Its discovery showed that modern mountain sheep first evolved from the genus Protovis.

References

Fossil taxa described in 2016
Sheep
Miocene mammals of Asia
Pliocene mammals of Asia
Prehistoric animals of China
Prehistoric caprids